Henry Ritterman (born 20 September 1951) is a former Australian rules footballer who played for Melbourne in the Victorian Football League during the 1970s.

Ritterman played most of his football on the ball but was also used at half-forward.

After being delisted by Melbourne, Ritterman played for Oakleigh in the Victorian Football Association and AJAX in the Victorian Amateur Football Association. In 2007, he was named in AJAX's team of the century.

Both Henry and his identical twin brother Michael represented Australia in athletics at the 1973 Maccabiah Games.  The brothers were inducted into the Maccabi Victoria Hall of Fame in 2000.

References

External links 
 
 Australian Football.com profile

1951 births
Australian rules footballers from Melbourne
Living people
Melbourne Football Club players
Oakleigh Football Club players
Melbourne High School Old Boys Football Club players
Australian twins
Twin sportspeople
Jewish Australian sportspeople
Maccabiah Games competitors for Australia
Maccabiah Games athletes (track and field)